Teodoro Goliardi (28 May 1927 – 1997) was a Uruguayan fencer. He competed in the individual sabre events at the 1956 and 1960 Summer Olympics. He finished second in the 1955 Pan American Games sabre team competition (with Ricardo Rimini, Juan Paladino, and the non-Olympian José Lardizábal), and third in the 1959 Pan American Games sabre.

References

External links
 

1927 births
1997 deaths
Uruguayan male sabre fencers
Olympic fencers of Uruguay
Fencers at the 1956 Summer Olympics
Fencers at the 1960 Summer Olympics
Pan American Games silver medalists for Uruguay
Pan American Games bronze medalists for Uruguay
Fencers at the 1955 Pan American Games
Fencers at the 1959 Pan American Games
Sportspeople from Montevideo
Pan American Games medalists in fencing
20th-century Uruguayan people
Medalists at the 1955 Pan American Games
Medalists at the 1959 Pan American Games